Darryl Richard Cias (born April 23, 1957) is a former professional baseball player. He played 19 games in Major League Baseball for the Oakland Athletics in 1983, mostly as a late-inning replacement for starting catcher Bob Kearney. He played in the minor leagues from 1975 until 1986, including a stint with the Nettuno Baseball Club in the Italian Baseball League in 1985.

External links
, or Retrosheet, or Pura Pelota

1957 births
Living people
Bluefield Orioles players
Major League Baseball catchers
Medford A's players
Miami Orioles players
Modesto A's players
Nettuno Baseball Club players
Oakland Athletics players
Salem Senators players
San Jose Bees players
Baseball players from New York City
Tacoma Tigers players
Tigres de Aragua players
American expatriate baseball players in Venezuela
Tulsa Drillers players
West Haven A's players
West Haven Whitecaps players